The 1999 Rugby Canada Super League season was the second season for the RCSL.

Standings
Western Division
{| class="wikitable" style="text-align: center;"
|-
! width="250"|Team
! width="20"|Pld
! width="20"|W
! width="20"|D
! width="20"|L
! width="20"|F
! width="20"|A
! width="25"|+/-
! width="20"|BP
! width="20"|Pts
|-
|align=left| Vancouver Island Crimson Tide
|6||6||0||0||232||89||+143||0||24
|-
|align=left| Fraser Valley Venom
|6||5||0||1||183||87||+96||1||21
|-
|align=left| Vancouver Wave
|6||4||0||2||143||128||+15||0||16
|-
|align=left| Manitoba Buffalo
|6||2||1||3||121||170||+20||1||11
|-
|align=left| Calgary Mavericks
|6||2||0||4||138||210||-72||0||8
|-
|align=left| Edmonton Gold
|6||1||0||5||122||160||-38||2||6
|-
|align=left| Saskatchewan Prairie Fire
|6||0||1||5||105||200||-95||1||3
|}

Eastern Division
{| class="wikitable" style="text-align: center;"
|-
! width="250"|Team
! width="20"|Pld
! width="20"|W
! width="20"|D
! width="20"|L
! width="20"|F
! width="20"|A
! width="25"|+/-
! width="20"|BP
! width="20"|Pts
|-
|align=left| Toronto Renegades
|5||4||1||0||195||38||+157||0||18
|-
|align=left| Nova Scotia Keiths
|5||4||1||0||131||49||+82||0||18
|-
|align=left| Eastern Ontario Harlequins
|5||2||0||3||109||142||-33||2||10
|-
|align=left| Newfoundland Rock
|5||2||0||3||133||111||+22||0||8
|-
|align=left| Montreal Menace
|5||1||0||4||82||165||-83||1||5
|-
|align=left| New Brunswick Black Spruce
|5||1||0||4||70||194||-124||1||5
|}

Note: A bonus point was awarded for a loss of 7 points or less

MacTier Cup

The Vancouver Island Crimson Tide (Western Division champions) defeated the Toronto Renegades (Eastern Division Champions) 23–11 in the Championship Final, played in Duncan, British Columbia on 24 July 1999.

Game summary

References

Rugby Canada Super League seasons
RCSL Season
1999 in Canadian rugby union